In geometry, ramification is 'branching out', in the way that the square root function, for complex numbers, can be seen to have two branches differing in sign. The term is also used from the opposite perspective (branches coming together) as when a covering map degenerates at a point of a space, with some collapsing of the fibers of the mapping.

In complex analysis

In complex analysis, the basic model can be taken as the z → zn mapping in the complex plane, near z = 0. This is the standard local picture in Riemann surface theory, of ramification of order n. It occurs for example in the Riemann–Hurwitz formula for the effect of mappings on the genus.

In algebraic topology

In a covering map the Euler–Poincaré characteristic should multiply by the number of sheets; ramification can therefore be detected by some dropping from that. The z → zn mapping shows this as a local pattern: if we exclude 0, looking at 0 < |z| < 1 say, we have (from the homotopy point of view) the circle mapped to itself by the n-th power map (Euler–Poincaré characteristic 0), but with the whole disk the Euler–Poincaré characteristic is 1, n – 1 being the 'lost' points as the n sheets come together at z = 0. 

In geometric terms, ramification is something that happens in codimension two (like knot theory, and monodromy); since real codimension two is complex codimension one, the local complex example sets the pattern for higher-dimensional complex manifolds. In complex analysis, sheets can't simply fold over along a line (one variable), or codimension one subspace in the general case. The ramification set (branch locus on the base, double point set above) will be two real dimensions lower than the ambient manifold, and so will not separate it into two 'sides', locally―there will be paths that trace round the branch locus, just as in the example. In algebraic geometry over any field, by analogy, it also happens in algebraic codimension one.

In algebraic number theory

In algebraic extensions of the rational numbers 

Ramification in algebraic number theory means a prime ideal factoring in an extension so as to give some repeated prime ideal factors. For a field extension  we can consider the
This ideal may or may not be prime, but for finite , it has a factorization into prime ideals:

An equivalent condition is that  has a non-zero nilpotent element: it is not a product of finite fields. The analogy with the Riemann surface case was already pointed out by Richard Dedekind and Heinrich M. Weber in the nineteenth century.

This condition is important in Galois module theory. A finite generically étale extension  of Dedekind domains is tame if and only if the trace  is surjective.

In local fields

The more detailed analysis of ramification in number fields can be carried out using extensions of the p-adic numbers, because it is a local question. In that case a quantitative measure of ramification is defined for Galois extensions, basically by asking how far the Galois group moves field elements with respect to the metric. A sequence of ramification groups is defined, reifying (amongst other things) wild (non-tame) ramification. This goes beyond the geometric analogue.

In algebra

In valuation theory, the ramification theory of valuations studies the set of extensions of a valuation of a field K to an extension field of K. This generalizes the notions in algebraic number theory, local fields, and Dedekind domains.

In algebraic geometry
There is also corresponding notion of unramified morphism in algebraic geometry. It serves to define étale morphisms.

Let  be a morphism of schemes. If  we say that  is formally unramified and if  is also of locally finite presentation we say that  is unramified (see ).

See also 
 Eisenstein polynomial
 Newton polygon
 Puiseux expansion
 Branched covering

References

External links 
 

Algebraic number theory
Algebraic topology
Complex analysis